{{Infobox film
| name = Raw Nerve
| image = RAW NERVE Starring Glen Ford Jan-Michael Vincent Tracy Lords (Large).JPG
| caption = Raw Nerve theatrical poster
| director = David A. Prior
| producer = Robert WilloughbyDavid WintersMark WintersRuta K Aras
| writer = David A. PriorLawrence L. Simeone	 
| starring = Glenn FordJan-Michael VincentTraci Lords
| cinematography = Andrew Parke
| music = Greg Turner
| editing = Tony Malanowski	 	
| released = 1991
| budget =
| runtime = 91 min.
| distributor = 
| language = English
| country = United States
}}Raw Nerve''' is a 1991 film directed and written by David A. Prior.  The film stars Glenn Ford in his final film role, Jan-Michael Vincent and Traci Lords.

Plot
A series of grotesque murders plagues the city of Mobile, Alabama where an unknown serial killer is killing women with a pump-action shotgun. A young race car driver, named Jimmy Clayton (Ted Prior), goes to the police where he talks with Lt. Detective Bruce Ellis (Jan-Michael Vincent) and his superior Captain Gavin (Glenn Ford) claiming that he has been having visions about the killer. Unfortunately, the police do not take him seriously, and Jimmy gets locked up as the suspect. A reporter named Gloria Freedman (Sandahl Bergman), who happens to be Ellis's ex-wife, falls in love with Jimmy and sets out prove his innocence and find the real killer.

Meanwhile, a rogue biker named Blake Garrett (Tex Cobb) learns about the murders and that Jimmy may be a suspect. He follows and accosts Gloria; telling her to stay away from Jimmy. Then Blake kidnaps Jimmy's younger sister Gina (Traci Lords) and attempts to leave the country with her, claiming that he is "protecting her". When Lt. Ellis begins to believe Jimmy's claims of innocence, he has Jimmy released and has him followed to find Blake who takes Gina to a local airport where he is attempting to leave the country with her. Thinking that Blake is the serial killer, the police chase him through the airport and in his pickup truck through the city where they corner him on a top ledge of a parking garage. When Jimmy attempts to talk to Blake, he releases Gina but drives his truck off the ledge and kills himself. When Captain Gavin finds a shotgun in Blake's truck which forensic tests prove it to be the murder weapon, the case of the "shotgun slayings" is closed. Or is it?

In the final scene, Gloria goes to Jimmy's house one evening for them go out on their first date when Jimmy begins acting strange toward her and suddenly attempts to kill her. It is revealed here that Jimmy really is the killer all along and that he committed the murders under a split-personality. Jimmy's alter ego, who is named 'Billy', murdered his and Gina's parents years earlier after they found out that Jimmy has dissociative identity disorder resulting from physical abuse by both his mother and father. Blake knew the whole time about Jimmy's D.I.D. and protected him out of blind loyalty. When Jimmy apparently discovered the truth, 'Billy' completely took over and he attempts to kill Gloria (A very similar plot twist and setting is used several years later in the 2005 thriller Hide and Seek''.) After a chase through the house, just when Gloria is about to be killed, Lt. Ellis runs in and saves her by shooting Billy/Jimmy dead.

Cast
 Glenn Ford as Captain Gavin
 Sandahl Bergman as Gloria Freedman
 Randall 'Tex' Cobb as Blake Garrett
 Ted Prior as Jimmy Clayton
 Traci Lords as Gina Clayton
 Jan-Michael Vincent as Lieutenant Bruce Ellis
 Red West as Dave
 Karen Johnson Miller as Paramedic

References

External links
 Review of Film from the New York Times
 
 

1991 films
1990s psychological thriller films
American thriller films
Films set in Alabama
Films shot in Mobile, Alabama
Action International Pictures films
Films directed by David A. Prior
1990s English-language films
1990s American films